Maximilian Leon Dubrawski (born July 1, 1949) is the Roman Catholic bishop of Kamianets-Podilskyi.

Life
Dubrawski was born near Zhytomyr, present day Ukraine. In 1978 he entered the seminary in Riga. On August 31, 1982, he joined the Franciscan Order (then province Bernardine). He was ordained on May 29, 1983 in Riga, Latvia from Cardinal Julijans Vaivods. On August 21, 1986 made his final vows. From 1983-1993 Dubrawski was pastor in Khmilnyk and the superior of the Custody of the Holy Franciscan Order of St. Michael the Archangel (Bernardine) in Ukraine.

On April 7, 1998 he was appointed as auxiliary bishop in Kamianets-Podilskyi. On 27 June 1998, received episcopal consecration at the hands of Cardinal Marian Jaworski. After the acceptance of the resignation of Bishop Jan Olszanski on May 4, 2002 he was appointed bishop - the Bishop of Kamianets-Podilskyi. In 2008 he was appointed vice chairman of the Ukrainian Episcopate.

His episcopal motto is "Pax et bonum" - Peace and Good.

References

External links
 http://www.catholic-hierarchy.org/bishop/bdubr.html 
 http://www.gcatholic.org/dioceses/diocese/kamy0.htm 
 http://www.kresy.pl/publicystyka,ludzie?zobacz/biskup-leon-maksymilian-dubrawski

1949 births
Living people
Ukrainian Roman Catholic bishops
Ukrainian people of Polish descent
People from Zhytomyr Oblast
Franciscan bishops
Ukrainian Friars Minor